The Forbidden Territory is a novel written by Dennis Wheatley and published by Hutchinson in 1933. His first published novel, it was an instant success and was translated into a number of languages. Alfred Hitchcock quickly bought the film rights.

Plot summary
The Duke de Richleau receives a letter that is a code from his missing friend the young American Rex Van Ryn, who hunted for treasure lost during the Soviet takeover of Russia, but who is now in prison somewhere in that vast country. He shares the letter with another young friend, Simon Aron, who agrees to accompany him to search for their friend.

Film adaptation

The novel was bought for adaptation to film by Alfred Hitchcock that was released in 1934 and distributed by Gaumont-British Picture Corporation. Its main actors were Gregory Ratoff, Ronald Squire, and Binnie Barnes, and it was directed by Phil Rosen.

References

Sources

External links

1933 British novels
British thriller novels
Novels set in the Soviet Union
British novels adapted into films
Hutchinson (publisher) books
Novels by Dennis Wheatley
1933 debut novels